The Government Degree College Pattan (Urdu;)also known as GDC Pattan, Pattan College, is a University of Kashmir affiliated degree college located at Pattan in Baramulla district of Indian administrated state of Jammu and Kashmir.The college is recognised by University Grants Commission of India under sections 2(f) and 12(b) of UGC, Act 1956. The college underwent first cycle of NAAC inspection in November 2021 and was graded 'C' grade with the score of 2.0 on 7 point scale.

Location
The college is located at Pattan in Baramulla district in the Indian administrated state of Jammu and Kashmir.

Establishment 
Government of Jammu and Kashmir established the college in the year 2005 during the Chief-Ministership of Mufti Mohammad Sayeed under Prime Minister of India's reconstruction plan.

Courses offered
The college offers various bachelor courses in Arts, Commerce and Science at the undergraduate level.

Bachelor courses

Bachelors in Arts
Bachelors in Science (Medical)
Bachelors in Science (Non-Medical)
Bachelors in Commerce
Bachelors of Science in Information Technology (B.Sc IT)

References

Degree colleges in Kashmir Division
Universities and colleges in Jammu and Kashmir
University of Kashmir
2005 establishments in Jammu and Kashmir
Educational institutions established in 2005